Microbacterium paraoxydans is a Gram-positive bacterium from the genus Microbacterium which was first isolated from the fish Nile tilapia in Mexico. This bacterium can cause disease in fish. Microbacterium paraoxydans metabolize (RS)-mandelonitrile to (R)-(-)mandelic acid. Microbacterium paraoxydans is a plant growth-promoting bacteria.

References

Further reading

External links
Type strain of Microbacterium paraoxydans at BacDive -  the Bacterial Diversity Metadatabase

]

Bacteria described in 2003
paraoxydans